James Franck Bright (29 May 1832 – 23 October 1920) was a British historian and Master of University College, Oxford.

Biography
James Franck Bright was born in London, the son of the physician Richard Bright, who described Bright's disease, and Eliza Follett, sister of lawyer-politicians Sir William Webb Follett  and Brent Follett . He was educated at Rugby School under Thomas Arnold and at University College, Oxford (matriculated 1851 aged 18, graduated B.A. 1855, M.A. 1858, B.D. and D.D. 1884).

From 1856, he was a schoolmaster at Marlborough College, where he was Head of the Modern Department for sixteen years, under the headmastership of George Granville Bradley. Bright wrote the necessary textbooks himself, including "History of England". Bradley had become Master of University College, Oxford in 1870; he recruited Bright to Oxford as a history tutor in 1872, tutoring at Balliol, New and University Colleges. Bright became Fellow and Dean of University College in 1874, and succeeded Bradley as Master of University College from 1881 to 1906.

Bright wrote a history of Victorian England, "The Growth of Democracy", and biographies of the Holy Roman Empress Maria Theresa and Emperor Joseph II. He was a progressive leader at Oxford, helping to improve teaching standards and arguing that theological degrees could be awarded to non-members of the Church of England. In 1882, Bright was one of the first dons at Oxford University to allow women students to attend his lectures, in University College Hall.

In addition to academic activities, Bright was a member of the Oxford City Council, and Treasurer of the Radcliffe Infirmary. He was also shot by a lady in an incident at University College, but survived.

The Shelley Memorial was installed during Bright's mastership, celebrating the life of the poet Percy Bysshe Shelley (1792–1822), an alumnus of University College. At an opening ceremony on 14 June 1893, Lady Jane Shelley, the widow of the poet's son Percy Florence Shelley (1819–1889), presented the Master with a golden key, giving access to the chamber containing the memorial. Bright described Shelley as "the rebel of eighty years ago", "the hero of the present century", and "a prophet who prophesied good things, and not bad".

Bright was lord of the manor of Brockbury in Colwall, Herefordshire, having inherited the estate by the will of his uncle Henry Bright  in 1869.

He died at Ditchingham, Norfolk, on 23 October 1920.

Some of Bright's sermon manuscripts are held in the University College archives.

Selected works
 English History for the Use of Public Schools
 Joseph II (1905)
 Maria Theresa
 The Growth of Democracy

References

Sources

External links
 
 
 
 Bright, James Franck (1832–1920) Master of University College, Oxford in the UK National Archives
 James Franck Bright, Master 1881–1906 at University College, Oxford
 Portrait of James Franck Bright  at University College, Oxford

1832 births
1920 deaths
Academics from London
People educated at Rugby School
19th-century English historians
Schoolteachers from Wiltshire
English biographers
Alumni of University College, Oxford
Fellows of University College, Oxford
Masters of University College, Oxford
English male non-fiction writers
People from Ditchingham